Aygestan may refer to:
 Aygestan - village in Armenia
 Aygestan, Askeran - village in the Askeran Province of Artsakh
 Çaylı, Tartar - village in the Tartar District of Azerbaijan
 Qoçbəyli - village in the Khojavend District of Azerbaijan